In enzymology, a salicylate 1-monooxygenase is an enzyme that catalyzes the chemical reaction

salicylate + NADH + 2 H+ + O2  catechol + NAD+ + H2O + CO2

The 4 substrates of this enzyme are salicylate, NADH, H+, and O2, whereas its 4 products are catechol, NAD+, H2O, and CO2.

This enzyme belongs to the family of oxidoreductases, specifically those acting on paired donors, with O2 as oxidant and incorporation or reduction of oxygen. The oxygen incorporated need not be derived from O2 with NADH or NADPH as one donor, and incorporation of one atom o oxygen into the other donor.  The systematic name of this enzyme class is salicylate,NADH:oxygen oxidoreductase (1-hydroxylating, decarboxylating). Other names in common use include salicylate hydroxylase, salicylate 1-hydroxylase, salicylate monooxygenase, and salicylate hydroxylase (decarboxylating).  This enzyme participates in 3 metabolic pathways: 1- and 2-methylnaphthalene degradation, naphthalene and anthracene degradation, and fluorene degradation.  It employs one cofactor, FAD.

References

 
 
 
 

EC 1.14.13
NADPH-dependent enzymes
NADH-dependent enzymes
Flavoproteins
Enzymes of unknown structure